Helen Marie Yate (1 January 1921 – 11 August 2020) was a British swimmer. She competed in the women's 100 metre backstroke at the 1948 Summer Olympics. She represented England and won a silver medal in the 330 yards medley relay and two bronze medals in the 110 yard backstroke and 440 yard freestyle relay at the 1950 British Empire Games in Auckland, New Zealand. At the ASA National British Championships she won the 110 yards backstroke title in 1949.

References

1921 births
2020 deaths
British female swimmers
Olympic swimmers of Great Britain
Swimmers at the 1948 Summer Olympics
Sportspeople from Plymouth, Devon
Commonwealth Games medallists in swimming
Commonwealth Games silver medallists for England
Commonwealth Games bronze medallists for England
Swimmers at the 1950 British Empire Games
British female backstroke swimmers
20th-century British women
Medallists at the 1950 British Empire Games